Hans Alexis von Biehler (16 June 1818 – 30 December 1886) was a Prussian general. He designed fortifications in many famous locations. Beginning in 1873, he saw fort construction in Cologne, Strasbourg, Poznań, Toruń, Königsberg, Ingolstadt, Metz, Kostrzyn, Spandau, Ulm, Mainz and Magdeburg.

Awards and decorations
 Iron Cross of 1870
2nd Class
1st Class (2 December 1870)
 Order of the Iron Crown, First Class (18 December 1877)
 Grand Cross of the Military Merit Order (Bavaria, 27 November 1877)
 Order of the Red Eagle, 1st Class with Oak Leaves (26 January 1879)
 Grand Cross of the Order of the Württemberg Crown (19 June 1879)
 Grand Officer of the Order of Aviz (25 November 1880)
 Grand Cross of the Albert Order (25 November 1880)

References

1818 births
1886 deaths
Generals of Infantry (Prussia)
Military personnel from Berlin
People from the Province of Brandenburg
Prussian people of the Austro-Prussian War
German military personnel of the Franco-Prussian War
Recipients of the Iron Cross (1870), 1st class
Grand Crosses of the Military Merit Order (Bavaria)
Grand Officers of the Order of Aviz
Commanders of the Order of Franz Joseph
German military engineers
Engineers from Berlin